Hamish Gaman (born 20 April 1983) is an English former competitive pair skater. With partner Caitlin Yankowskas, he is the 2015 Challenge Cup silver medalist and 2015 British national champion. Since 2018, he has appeared on the ITV series Dancing on Ice.

Career
Gaman competed with Rebecca Collett in the 2003–04 season. They appeared at one ISU Junior Grand Prix event, placing 11th, and at the 2004 World Junior Championships, where they finished 14th. In 2007, he teamed up with Vanessa James but she ended the partnership in January 2008 to skate for France. He then worked as a coach in the U.K.

In May 2013, Gaman formed a partnership with American skater Caitlin Yankowskas, coached by Johnny Johns and Marina Zueva in Canton, Michigan. Representing the United Kingdom, they earned minimum technical scores at the 2013 Ice Challenge. The pair went on to take the bronze medal at the 2014 British Championships. In mid-February 2014, they moved to Boston and began training under Bobby Martin and Carrie Wall at the Skating Club of Boston. After spending part of June 2014 in Montreal, coached by Bruno Marcotte and Richard Gauthier, the pair decided to move there in July. At the 2015 European Championships in Stockholm, Yankowskas/Gaman placed seventh in the short program, 14th in the free skate, and ninth overall.

On September 10, 2015, Yankowskas and Gaman announced their retirements from competitive figure skating due to lack of funding.

Dancing on Ice
In 2018, Gaman joined the cast of the ITV competition series Dancing on Ice as a professional skater. In series 10, his celebrity partner was Olympic athlete Perri Shakes-Drayton. They were eliminated on 28 January 2018, after a skate-off with Lemar and Melody Le Moal. In the eleventh series, he was partnered with singer Saara Aalto. They finished in third place after making it into the final.

For the twelfth series, Gaman was partnered with model and actress Caprice Bourret. After their first performance, Oscar Peter replaced Gaman as her partner but Gaman continued to appear in group performances on the show. Deciding to withdraw in mid-February, Gaman stated, "The past three and a half months have been the worst of my life, and I'm struggling." He said that "untrue stories are continually being fed to the press by a 'source'."

Personal life
Gaman became engaged to Amelia Humfress in March 2020. Both Gaman and Humfress are vegan.

Programs

With Yankowskas

With Collett

Competitive highlights 
CS: Challenger Series; JGP: Junior Grand Prix

With Yankowskas

With Collett

References

External links 
 Official site of Yankowskas/Gaman
 

1983 births
English male pair skaters
Living people
Sportspeople from Chertsey